Linguiça or lingüiça is a Brazilian and Portuguese sausage made from pork and seasoned with onion, garlic, paprika and other spices. It can be eaten fresh after being prepared or undergo a curing and conservation process through smoking.

Uses in Brazilian and Portuguese cuisine
Linguiça, like many other sausages, is generally served as part of a meal, typically accompanied by rice, beans, and other pork products. Feijoada, for example, is a traditional Portuguese and Brazilian dish (considered Brazil's national dish), also common in Angola, that incorporates linguiça with beans, ham hocks, and other foods.

In Brazil, one variant is especially popular: the linguiça calabresa or simply calabresa, prepared originally with Calabrese pepper (nowadays with South American pepper) by Italian immigrants, and particularly used in pizzas as a spicy sausage. Its popularity compares with pepperoni in the United States. It is common to differentiate the linguiça calabresa from its counterpart linguiça portuguesa, prepared from the original Portuguese recipe, and also served in pizzas as mild sausage, generally with egg slices.

Linguiça is also used in francesinha, a traditional Portuguese dish, from Porto. The linguiça is incorporated in its sauce, giving it a distinct flavor.

Popularity and uses outside Portugal and Brazil
Outside of Portugal and Brazil, linguiça is also popular in Goa, Macau, and other former Portuguese colonial possessions. In these regions, it is typically sliced before being grilled or braised, often with a light-bodied beer. It is also popular in California, Rhode Island, and southern Massachusetts. In Hawaii, McDonald's restaurants serve breakfasts featuring linguiça. Hawaiian linguiça, also known as Portuguese sausage, is usually smoked using banana leaves.

Linguiça is a popular dish in Mangalore among the Catholic community. Mangalorean linguiça is spicier than Portuguese linguiça, and is more closely related to Goan chouriço. It is strongly flavored with red chillies, peppercorns, turmeric, and salt. It is typically prepared by half-frying onions, adding sugar and vinegar to the meat, and cooking over a low flame, preferably wood fire.

See also

 List of smoked foods

References

 Linguiça Artesanal: from the original on 12 July 2018.

External links

 

Portuguese sausages
Portuguese cuisine
Brazilian cuisine
Hawaiian cuisine
Smoked meat